The R725 road is a regional road in Ireland. From its junction with the N80 on the western outskirts of Carlow Town it takes an  easterly route to its junction with the N81 in Tullow, where it crosses the River Slaney on a bridge shared with the N81 in the town centre. It continues east to Shillelagh in County Wicklow, turns due south for 6 km, then eastwards through Carnew. It then enters County Wexford for the final 15 km stretch, terminating in Gorey at the R772.

See also
Roads in Ireland
National primary road
National secondary road

References
Roads Act 1993 (Classification of Regional Roads) Order 2006 – Department of Transport

Regional roads in the Republic of Ireland
Roads in County Carlow
Roads in County Wicklow
Roads in County Wexford